CataCXium F sulf is a water-soluble organophosphorus compound derived from fluorene. The palladium complexes of the respective phosphine show an excellent activity in various palladium-catalyzed coupling reactions, including Suzuki reactions, Sonogashira couplings and Buchwald–Hartwig reactions.

References
 C.A. Fleckenstein; H. Plenio, Highly efficient Suzuki-Miyaura coupling of heterocyclic substrates through rational reaction design. Chemistry-A European Journal 2008, 14(14), 4267–4279.
 C.A. Fleckenstein; H. Plenio, Aqueous/organic cross coupling: Sustainable protocol for Sonogashira reactions of heterocycles. Green Chemistry 2008, 10, 563–570. 
 C.A. Fleckenstein; H. Plenio, Efficient Suzuki-Miyaura Coupling of (Hetero)aryl Chlorides with Thiophene- and Furanboronic Acids in Aqueous n-Butanol. Journal of Organic Chemistry 2008, 73, 3236–3244.
 C.A Fleckenstein; R. Kadyrov; H. Plenio, Efficient Large-Scale Synthesis of 9-Alkylfluorenyl Phosphines for Pd-Catalyzed Cross-Coupling Reactions. Organic Process Research & Development 2008, 12, 475–479.
 C.A. Fleckenstein; H. Plenio, Aqueous cross-coupling. Highly efficient Suzuki–Miyaura coupling of N-heteroaryl halides and N-heteroarylboronic acids. Green Chemistry 2007, 9, 1287–1291.

External links 
 Product information from  Sigma-Aldrich
 information from Strem Chemicals

Organometallic chemistry
Organophosphorus compounds
Fluorenes